Blair Brown (born May 27, 1994) is an American football linebacker. He played college football at  Ohio University.

College career
Brown was ranked first in FBS in tackling efficiency with just three misses and 96 solo tackles while at Ohio University. In 2016, only Reuben Foster had higher overall and run-defense grades according to Pro Football Focus than Brown's 92.4 and 91.5. Brown's 131 total tackles tied for the second-most among FBS inside linebackers. Brown was ranked third in FBS in run-stop percentage and had 47 stops.

Professional career
Brown was drafted by the Jacksonville Jaguars in the fifth round, 148th overall, in the 2017 NFL Draft. He played in 28 games for the team before he was released on May 9, 2019.

Brown was charged with domestic battery on May 30, 2019, but had the charges dismissed in July 2020 and the NFL announced in October 2020 he would not receive league discipline for the incident. He worked out for the Houston Texans on October 17, 2020.

Brown was drafted by the Pittsburgh Maulers in the 31st round of the 2022 USFL Draft on February 24, 2022. He was transferred to the team's practice squad before the start of the regular season on April 16. He remained on the inactive roster on April 22. He was transferred to the active roster on April 30. He was released on May 5.

References

External links
 Ohio Bobcats bio
 Jacksonville Jaguars bio

1994 births
Living people
American football linebackers
Jacksonville Jaguars players
Ohio Bobcats football players
People from Moreno Valley, California
Players of American football from California
Sportspeople from Riverside County, California
Pittsburgh Maulers (2022) players